Quinta Vigia, also known as Quinta das Angústias and Quinta Lambert, is a quinta located in the city of Funchal, on the island of Madeira, which serves as the official residence and office of the President of the Regional Government of the Autonomous Region of Madeira.

History 
During the 19th century several illustrious personalities passed through or lived in this quinta, due to several reasons. 

The original name of this quinta was Quinta das Angústias, due to having a chapel dating from the 17th century that invoked Our Lady of Anguish.

Shortly thereafter Count Lambert, former field aide to the Russian empress, acquired the farm, having changed its name to Quinta Lambert. The farm returned to its old name Quinta das Angústias when it was acquired by Madeiran João Paulo de Freitas in 1903.

Official residency 
In 1979, when the Autonomy had already been implemented in Madeira, the property was purchased by the Regional Government. For some time, its facilities were used to house the Madeira Conservatory of Music, until it was transferred to the old Hotel Nova Avenida in 1981. The quinta was renamed "Quinta Vigia" in 1982, after the original Quinta Vigia, located nearby and on the site of the current Hotel Pestana Casino Park, had disappeared.

After works in its gardens, chapel and palace, the quinta was inaugurated as a residence. of the President of the Government on May 2, 1984. The gardens of the farm are open to the public, being mainly visited by foreign tourists. The farm also offers a beautiful view over the bay of Funchal.

References 

Neoclassical architecture in Portugal
Baroque architecture in Portugal
Presidential residences
Official residences in Portugal
Funchal